The China–Nepal Railway is a planned railway between China and Nepal. The railway will link Kathmandu with Shigatse, Tibet, crossing the China–Nepal border at Gyirong–Rasuwa.

History
As early as 1973, Mao Zedong proposed a connection between the two countries to King Birendra of Nepal in Beijing.

In 2006, the Qinghai–Tibet Railway, the first railway in Tibet, was completed. The same year, the then chairman of Tibet Autonomous Region Qiangba Puncog told the current Prime Minister of Nepal Khadga Prasad Oli, then Deputy Prime Minister, that the railway would be extended to Shigatse and eventually to China–Nepal border.

In 2016, during Oli's visit to China, the two countries signed a treaty on trade and transit, including a plan to build a high speed railway from Kathmandu to the Chinese border. In June 2018, Nepal and China agreed on construction of the railway as a component of a series of cooperation projects approved by the two sides. A mutual agreement over the pre-feasibility study was reached in August 2018. The railway has been viewed as a way to reduce Nepal's dependence on India, which was made apparent during the 2015 Nepal blockade.

The first extension of the Tibetan Railway, the Lhasa–Shigatse railway, opened in 2014.  China plans to extend this railway up to Lake Paiku/Gyirong, which is around 60 km from the Rasuwa border crossing. Construction of the railway from Shigatse to Gyirong is expected to be complete by 2022. 

The cost of the Nepalese section of the railway has been estimated to be from US$ 2.7 billion  up to 5.5 billion, but no agreement has been reached yet over the funding, with Nepal unable to bear the full cost of the railway. A Chinese pre-feasibility study proposed a tunnel under the Langtang National Park to avoid a steep gradient and building in the protected area. In a straight line, the distance between Kathmandu and the border with China is just 70 km.

Route
Existing Lanzhou–Kathmandu and Xi'an–Kathmandu freight routes involve cargo being carried by trucks from Shigatse through Gyirong border post to Nepal. This first leg of the route starts from Lanzhou, a major freight hub in the Chinese railway network, to Xining over the Lanzhou–Qinghai railway (opened 1959), from Xining to Lhasa over the Qinghai–Tibet railway (opened 2006), and from Lhasa to Shigatse over the Lhasa–Xigazê railway (opened 2014).

Within China, the new railway, which will cross  of Chinese territory before reaching the Nepali border, will mostly follow the route of China National Highway 318 after leaving Shigatse, passing through Lhatse, Sa'gya, Dinggyê, Tingri, and Nyalam. After reaching Nyalam, the railway will follow Highway 219 to Gyirong.

There will be four stations along the line, with the terminal at Sankhu in Kathmandu. A further extension to Pokhara and Lumbini is planned.

See also 

 Railway in Nepal
 8 different India–Nepal cross-border rail lines
 Churia Tunnel
 China-Laos railway

References

Rail transport in China
Rail transport in Nepal
Rail transport in Tibet
Mountain railways
China–Nepal relations